The Presbyterian College Blue Hose baseball team is a varsity intercollegiate athletic team of Presbyterian College in Clinton, South Carolina. The team is a member of the Big South Conference, which is part of the National Collegiate Athletic Association's Division I. The team plays its home games at Presbyterian Baseball Complex in Clinton, South Carolina. The Blue Hose are coached by Elton Pollock.

Major League Baseball
Presbyterian College has had 6 Major League Baseball Draft selections since the draft began in 1965.

See also
List of NCAA Division I baseball programs

References

External links